Onondaga County is a county in the U.S. state of New York. As of the 2020 census, the population was 476,516. The county seat is Syracuse.

Onondaga County is the core of the Syracuse, NY MSA.

History

The name Onondaga derives from the name of the Native American tribe who lived in this area at the time of European contact, one of the original Five Nations of the Haudenosaunee. They called themselves (autonym) Onoda'gega, sometimes spelled Onontakeka. The word means "People of the Hills." Sometimes the term was Onondagaono ("The People of the Hills"). The federally recognized Onondaga Nation has a  reservation within the county, on which they have self-government.

When counties were established in New York in 1683, the present Onondaga County was part of Albany County. This enormous county included the northern part of New York State as well as all of the present State of Vermont and, in theory, extended westward to the Pacific Ocean. It was reduced in size on July 3, 1766, by the creation of Cumberland County, and further on March 16, 1770, by the creation of Gloucester County, both containing territory now in Vermont.

On March 12, 1772, what was left of Albany County was split into three parts, one remaining under the name Albany County. One of the other pieces, Tryon County, contained the western portion (and thus, since no western boundary was specified, theoretically still extended west to the Pacific). The area then designated as Tryon County now includes 37 counties of New York State. The county was named for William Tryon, colonial governor of New York.

In the years prior to 1776, most of the Loyalists in Tryon County fled to Canada. The Onondaga were among four Iroquois tribes that allied with the British against the American colonists, as they hoped to end their encroachment. Instead, they were forced to cede most of their land in New York to the United States after the war. Many Onondaga went with Joseph Brant and other nations to Canada, where they received land grants in compensation and formed the Six Nations of the Grand River First Nation.

In 1784, after a peace treaty ended the American Revolutionary War, the name of Tryon County was changed to Montgomery County. It honored General Richard Montgomery, who had captured several places in Canada and died attempting to capture the city of Quebec, and replaced the name of the hated British governor.

In 1789, Montgomery County was reduced by the splitting off of Ontario County from Montgomery. The actual area split off from Montgomery County was much larger than the present county, also including the present Allegany, Cattaraugus, Chautauqua, Erie, Genesee, Livingston, Monroe, Niagara, Orleans, Steuben, Wyoming, Yates, and part of Schuyler and Wayne Counties.

In 1791, Herkimer County was one of three counties split off from Montgomery (the other two being Otsego, and Tioga County). This was much larger than the present county, however, and was reduced by a number of subsequent splits.

In 1794, Onondaga County was split off from Herkimer County. This county was larger than the current Onondaga County, including the present Cayuga, Cortland, and part of Oswego Counties.

In 1799, Cayuga County was split off from Onondaga.

In 1808, Cortland County was split off from Onondaga.

In 1816, parts of Oneida and Onondaga Counties were taken to form the new Oswego County.

At the time Onondaga County was organized, it was divided into eleven towns: Homer, Pompey, Manlius, Lysander, Marcellus, Ulysses, Milton, Scipio, Ovid, Aurelius and Romulus.

Central New York developed rapidly after the New Military Tract provided land in lieu of payment to Revolutionary War veterans. Migration was largely from the east, mostly from New England states. The Genesee Road, which became the Seneca Turnpike in 1800, provided access. Generally settlers preferred higher land, since they associated lowlands with disease. Over time, as early clearing and farming eroded hillside soil, valley lands were more fertile and highly prized for agriculture as well as for water power, which was the origin of many communities. An early settler of 1823 was James Hutchinson Woodworth, a native of Washington County, NY. He helped clear land for his family's farm in this region before he moved to Chicago where he became Mayor. The completion of the Erie Canal across New York state in 1825 accelerated trade, development and migration.

The city of Syracuse, New York developed relatively late, due to its marshy situation. It was incorporated as a village in 1825 and as a city in 1847; by contrast, the Village of Manlius, along the Cherry Valley and Seneca Turnpikes, was incorporated in 1813. The population of these rural towns was greatest in the late nineteenth century, when more people cultivated land and farms were relatively small, supporting large households.

Since that time, agriculture has declined in the county. Some Onondaga County towns like Spafford were largely depopulated and many villages became veritable ghost towns. Onondaga County highlands now are more heavily reforested, with public parks and preserves providing recreation. Two Finger Lakes in the county, Skaneateles and Otisco, also attract visitors. The village of Skaneateles on scenic Route 20 has become a major tourist destination.

At the turn of the twenty-first century, population declined in the City of Syracuse while suburban communities generally grew, particularly with tract developments north of the city. Elsewhere, scattered commuter houses appeared, generally on fairly large parcels. The rapid development of the village of Skaneateles and shores of Skaneateles Lake led to increased demand for property and property values.

Geography
Onondaga County is in the central portion of New York State, west of Albany and Utica, east of Rochester and northeast of Ithaca. Onondaga Lake is bordered by many of the larger communities in the county. The highest point in Onondaga County is at 2057 feet, along Morgan Hill located just east of Morgan Hill State Forest on private property. The second highest point in Onondaga County is at 2019 feet elevation and on the summit of Fellows Hill which is located in Morgan Hill State Forest near Fabius and Apulia south of state route 80.

The northern part of the county is fairly level lake plain, extending northward to Lake Ontario. Oneida Lake three rivers, as well as the Erie and subsequent Barge Canals are in the lake plain. The main line of the New York Central Railroad and the New York State Thruway extend east and west across the county through the lake plain. The southern part of the county is Appalachian Plateau, with high hills rising at the southern edge of Syracuse. This is the eastern part of the Finger Lakes region. Skaneateles Lake and Otisco Lake are both in Onondaga County. US 20 extends east and west across the county, traversing dramatic hill-and-valley terrain. Between the lake plain and Appalachian highlands is a zone noted for drumlins, smaller, scattered hills formed as mounds of debris left by the last glacier. Tully is geologically noted for the terminal moraine deposited there by the glacier, filling the deep Tully Valley, which might have been another Finger Lake had the moraine been left closer to Syracuse, impounding water. Tully is at the divide between two major watersheds, one flowing northward to the Atlantic Ocean by way of the St. Lawrence River and the other southward to the ocean via the Susquehanna River.  Oneida Lake, the Finger Lakes, and smaller bodies of water provide recreation. The Appalachian hills have several ski areas, waterfalls and historic villages as well as large parks and forest preserves.

Lakes and reservoirs

 Jamesville Reservoir
 Oneida Lake
 Onondaga Lake
 Otisco Lake
 Skaneateles Lake

Adjacent counties

 Oswego County – north
 Madison County – east
 Cortland County – south
 Cayuga County – west

Major highways

  Interstate 81
  Interstate 481 (Veterans Memorial Highway)
  Interstate 90 (New York State Thruway)
  Interstate 690
  U.S. Route 11
  U.S. Route 20
  New York State Route 5
  New York State Route 31
  New York State Route 41
  New York State Route 92
  New York State Route 481 (Veterans Memorial Highway)
  New York State Route 690

Demographics

As of the census of 2000, the county had 458,336 people, 181,153 households, and 115,394 families. The population density was 587 people per square mile (227/km2). There were 196,633 housing units at an average density of 252 per square mile (97/km2). The county's racial makeup was 84.78% White, 9.38% African American, 0.86% Native American, 2.09% Asian, 0.03% Pacific Islander, 0.89% from other races, and 1.97% from two or more races. Hispanics or Latinos of any race were 2.44% of the population. About 17.5% were of Italian, 16.2% Irish, 12.4% German, 9.4% English, and 6.0% Polish ancestry according to the 2000 United States Census, and 91.4% spoke English, 2.4% Spanish and 1.1% Italian as their first language.

Of the 181,153 households, 31.90% had children under age 18 living with them, 46.90% were married couples living together, 12.90% had a female householder with no husband present, and 36.30% were not families. About 29.40% of all households were made up of individuals, and 10.80% had someone living alone who was 65 years of age or older. The average household size was 2.46 and the average family size was 3.07.

25.80% of the county's population was under age 18, 9.50% was from age 18 to 24, 28.80% was from age 25 to 44, 22.10% was from age 45 to 64, and 13.80% was age 65 or older. The median age was 36 years. For every 100 females, there were 91.70 males. For every 100 females age 18 and over, there were 87.70 males.

The county's median household income was $40,847, and the median family income was $51,876. Males had a median income of $39,048 versus $27,154 for females. The county's per capita income was $21,336. About 8.60% of families and 12.20% of the population were below the poverty line, including 15.50% of those under age 18 and 7.10% of those age 65 or over.

2020 Census

Education
Onondaga is home to Syracuse University, a major research university and SUNY Upstate Medical University, a public medical school. Upstate Medical University is the largest producer of jobs in the region with a direct workforce of 10,959 employees.

Other higher educational institutions include SUNY Oswego’s Syracuse Campus,
Le Moyne College,
SUNY College of Environmental Science and Forestry,
Onondaga Community College,
St. Joseph’s College of Nursing, and 
several for-profit colleges.

Government and politics

|}

Government 
Onondaga County was governed exclusively by a board of supervisors until 1961, when voters approved the creation of the county executive.  In 1968, the board reorganized into a 24-seat county legislature.  In 2001, the legislature was reduced to 19 seats. In 2010, voters approved a measure to reduce the legislature to 17 seats. None of the legislative seats, nor the county executive's seat, are at-large. Currently, there are 11 Republicans and 6 Democrats. J. Ryan McMahon II (R) is the current County Executive.

Politics 
Historically, Onondaga County was a Republican stronghold, like most of Central New York. From 1856 to 1988, the GOP carried the county in all but one presidential election, Lyndon B. Johnson's landslide in 1964. As a measure of how Republican the county was at the time, native son Franklin D. Roosevelt failed to win the county even once during his four successful runs for president, even in his 1936 landslide. Since 1992, the county has gone Democratic in every presidential election, much like many urban counties around the country. However, it is a swing county in congressional, state and local races. Onondaga is entirely located within New York's 22nd Congressional District, represented by Republican Brandon Williams. Democratic strength is concentrated in Syracuse itself, while Republicans do well in the suburbs.

, the sheriff of Onondaga County is Eugene J. Conway. Along with Broome County, New York, Onondaga County was sued in 2017 over placing juvenile inmates in solitary confinement.

Communities

Syracuse, the county seat, is the only city in Onondaga County. The following is a list of official towns, villages, and hamlets.

Population ranking 

† - County seat

‡ - Not entirely in Onondaga County

List of municipalities

Towns

 Camillus
 Cicero
 Clay
 DeWitt
 Elbridge
 Fabius
 Geddes
 LaFayette
 Lysander
 Manlius
 Marcellus
 Onondaga
 Otisco
 Pompey
 Salina
 Skaneateles
 Spafford
 Tully
 Van Buren

Hamlets

 Amber
 Apulia
 Borodino
 Cardiff
 Delphi Falls
 Jack's Reef
 Jamesville
 Kirkville
 Marietta
 Mattydale
 Memphis
 Messina Springs
 Mottville
 Mycenae
 Navarino
 Onondaga Hill
 Oran
 Otisco
 Otisco Valley
 Plainville
 Pompey Center
 Rose Hill
 Shepard Settlement
 Skaneateles Falls
 South Spafford
 Spafford Valley
 Split Rock
 Taunton
 Warners

Native American reservations
 Onondaga Reservation

See also

 List of bus routes in Onondaga County, New York
 List of counties in New York
 National Register of Historic Places listings in Onondaga County, New York
 Onondaga Creek
 Timeline of town creation in Onondaga County

References

Further reading

External links

  Onondaga County, NY official site
 
  Onondaga County, NY US GenWeb Project
 Onondaga County, NY U.S. Census Page
 Onondaga County Historical Aerial Photographs of New York , Cornell University Library & Cornell Institute for Resource Information Sciences

 
1794 establishments in New York (state)
Syracuse metropolitan area
Populated places established in 1794
New York placenames of Native American origin